This is the results breakdown of the local elections held in Galicia on 10 June 1987. The following tables show detailed results in the autonomous community's most populous municipalities, sorted alphabetically.

Overall

City control
The following table lists party control in the most populous municipalities, including provincial capitals (shown in bold). Gains for a party are displayed with the cell's background shaded in that party's colour.

Municipalities

A Coruña
Population: 239,150

Ferrol
Population: 86,154

Lugo
Population: 75,623

Ourense
Population: 100,143

Pontevedra
Population: 67,289

Santiago de Compostela
Population: 86,250

Vigo
Population: 261,878

References

Galicia
1987